1 Samuel 29 is the twenty-ninth chapter of the First Book of Samuel in the Old Testament of the Christian Bible or the first part of the Books of Samuel in the Hebrew Bible. According to Jewish tradition the book was attributed to the prophet Samuel, with additions by the prophets Gad and Nathan, but modern scholars view it as a composition of a number of independent texts of various ages from c. 630–540 BCE. This chapter contains the account of David's escape from Saul's repeated attempts to kill him. This is within a section comprising 1 Samuel 16 to 2 Samuel 5 which records the rise of David as the king of Israel.

Text
This chapter was originally written in the Hebrew language. It is divided into 11 verses.

Textual witnesses
Some early manuscripts containing the text of this chapter in Hebrew are of the Masoretic Text tradition, which includes the Codex Cairensis (895), Aleppo Codex (10th century), and Codex Leningradensis (1008). Fragments containing parts of this chapter in Hebrew were found among the Dead Sea Scrolls including 4Q51 (4QSam; 100–50 BCE) with extant verse 1.

Extant ancient manuscripts of a translation into Koine Greek known as the Septuagint (originally made in the last few centuries BCE) include Codex Vaticanus (B; B; 4th century) and Codex Alexandrinus (A; A; 5th century).

Places 

Aphek
Jezreel
Ziklag

The Philistines reject David (29:1–5)
The Philistines mustered their forces at Aphek ready to face Saul in the plain of Jezreel, when their commanders noticed  the presence of 'Hebrews' in their ranks— easily distinguished from their clothing rather than from any racial characteristics. Probably remembering how the 'Hebrews' had defected at Michmash (1 Samuel 13–14), the Philistines were adamant not to allow David and his people to join their army, evenmore as they still recalled the victory song which ascribed to David for the death of "tens of thousands" of Philistines.

Verse 1
Now the Philistines gathered together all their armies to Aphek: and the Israelites pitched by a fountain which is in Jezreel.
"Aphek": a common place name using a Hebrew word meaning "fortress". There is one in Judah (1 Samuel 4:1), and here is identified with the modern village Fuku'a, near Mount Gilboa, within to the territory of the tribe of Issachar.
"A fountain which is in Jezreel" is identified with the modern name Ain-Jalûd, the "Fountain of Goliath" (because it was traditionally regarded as the place of the battle with Goliath), a large spring which flows from under the cavern in the rock at the base of Gilboa.

Achish sends David back to Ziklag (29:6–11)
Pressured by other Philistine leaders, Achish was compelled to send David back to Ziklag, although he had never personally doubted David's loyalty, even found David faultless, honest, blameless 'as an angel of God' (verses 3, 6–7, 9–10). David declared his innocence to Achish and obeyed the command to return home, therefore saved from having to participate in the death of Saul and Jonathan.

Verse 10
[Achish said to David] "Now therefore, rise early in the morning with your master’s servants who have come with you. And as soon as you are up early in the morning and have light, depart."
After "come with you", the Septuagint has "and go to the place which I have selected for you there; and set no bothersome word in your heart, for you are good before me. And rise on your way", which is not present in the Masoretic Text, Targum, or Latin Vulgate versions.
"Your master's servants who have come with you": according to Barnes may refer to a considerable number of Manassites who decided to follow David (1 Chronicles 12:19–21) just at this time, and went back with him to Ziklag.

See also

Related Bible parts: 1 Samuel 27, 1 Samuel 28, 1 Samuel 30

Notes

References

Sources

Commentaries on Samuel

General

External links
 Jewish translations:
 Shmuel I - I Samuel - Chapter 29 (Judaica Press). Hebrew text and English translation [with Rashi's commentary] at Chabad.org
 Christian translations:
 Online Bible at GospelHall.org (ESV, KJV, Darby, American Standard Version, Bible in Basic English)
 1 Samuel chapter 29. Bible Gateway

29